The Reformed Church of Thurgau or Evangelische Landeskirche des Kantons Thurgau is a Reformed state cantonal church in Thurgau, Switzerland. It was founded in 1803. The official language is German. Member of the Schweizerischer Evangelischer Kirchenbund. The Reformed Church of Thurgau has 66 parishes. Women ordination is allowed. The Blessing of same-sex unions is allowed.

External links 
Reformed Landeskirche Thurgau
Reformed Churches in Switzerland

References 

Buildings and structures in Thurgau
Thurgau
Thurgau